is a tram stop in Ukyo-ku, Kyoto, Japan. It carries the distinction of being the longest-named train station in Japan, with 26 hiragana characters.

The station was renamed from Tojiin Station on March 20, 2020 in order to reflect its proximity to the main Kinugasa Campus of Ritsumeikan University. It was reported that while train operator Keifuku had considered shortening the new station name, they decided against it after discovering it would become the longest-named train station in the country.

Station layout 
The station consists of two split-platforms at ground level.

Adjacent stations

References

External links 
 
 

Stations of Keifuku Electric Railroad
Railway stations in Japan opened in 1925